Tusculum is a neighborhood in Nashville, within Davidson County, Tennessee.

Education
Tusculum Elementary School is located in Tusculum.

References

Neighborhoods in Nashville, Tennessee